This article contains the record of Stade Toulousain rugby union club in championship and cup finals.

French championship

Heineken Cup

References

Stade Toulousain